The Benninghoven GmbH & Co. KG is a German company based in Mülheim an der Mosel. It is a world-leading supplier of asphalt mixing plants, machines and services to the construction industry.
The company was established in 1909 by Otto Benninghoven in Hilden. It started with the production of gear wheels and various machinery. At the beginning of the 1950s the company started to produce industrial burners. At the beginning of the 1960s it entered the asphalt mixing industry, the first products being burners, dryers and bitumen systems. In 2007 the company employed around 600 people.[1]

Construction and civil engineering companies of Germany
Companies based in North Rhine-Westphalia
Construction equipment manufacturers of Germany
Construction and civil engineering companies established in 1909
German companies established in 1909